The science fiction manga series Please Save My Earth was written and illustrated by Saki Hiwatari. The main characters of the story are high school student Alice Sakaguchi, her seven-year-old neighbor Rin Kobayashi and five other teenage students, all of whom have recurring collective dreams about a group of alien scientists stationed on the moon to observe and collect data about the Earth.

The series was first published by Hakusensha in the shōjo magazine (aimed at teenage girls) Hana to Yume, from 1987 to 1994. It was collected in 21 tankōbon volumes. It was reissued in a 12 bunkoban volume edition in 1998 and again in an A5 format edition (wide-ban) of 10 volumes in 2004.

The manga was licensed in English in North America by Viz Media, which released all tankōbon volumes from October 2003 to March 2007. It was additionally translated into Italian by Planet Manga, into French by Tonkam and German by Carlsen Verlag.



Volume list

References

Please Save My Earth